Sweta Shervegar is an Indian sailor. She won the silver medal at the 2018 Asian Games in women's 49er event, along with Varsha Gautham. She is a homeopathic doctor and she did her internship in Yerala Medical College in Navi Mumbai.

References

Indian female sailors (sport)
Living people
Asian Games medalists in sailing
Sailors at the 2018 Asian Games
1990 births
Asian Games silver medalists for India
Medalists at the 2018 Asian Games